Inauguration of Dilma Rousseff may refer to: 

First inauguration of Dilma Rousseff, 2011
Second inauguration of Dilma Rousseff, 2015